Melanie Sloss is an Australian Judge in the Trial Division of the Supreme Court of Victoria and sits as a judge of the Commercial Court.

Sloss was first admitted to practice in Western Australia in 1980 and in Victoria in 1985.
She was appointed as Senior Counsel in 2002 and served as Junior Vice-Chairman, Senior Vice-Chairman and Chair of the Victorian Bar Council. Justice Sloss took up her appointment to the Supreme Court on 30 July 2013.

References

21st-century Australian judges
Australian women judges
Living people
Year of birth missing (living people)
Judges of the Supreme Court of Queensland
21st-century women judges